The Pig War, or Customs War (Царински рат/Carinski rat), was a trade war between Austria-Hungary and the Kingdom of Serbia in 1906 to 1908 during which the Habsburgs unsuccessfully imposed a customs blockade on Serbian pork.

Background 
In the early 20th century, Serbia was economically a satellite of the Habsburgs, its major export being pork, most of which was bought by Austria-Hungary. When Serbia started trying to evade economic and political control by the Habsburgs and to build links with other countries, particularly Bulgaria, Germany and France, the Hungarian government decided to punish the Serbs with economic sanctions. Specifically, in an attempt to reduce its economic dependence on Austria-Hungary, Serbia began to import French, rather than Austro-Hungarian, munitions and established a commercial treaty with Germany in 1904 and a customs union with Bulgaria in 1905 that ended the sale of tariff-laden Austrian goods in Serbia.

History 
Long used to setting economic policy, Austria-Hungary responded in April 1906 by closing its borders to Serbian pork. Serbia refused to bow to Vienna, gained French investment to build new packing plants for international trade, began to order materials from the Austro-Hungarian rival Germany
and pressured the Austrian-administrated provinces of Bosnia and Herzegovina for a trade outlet on the Adriatic Sea. That caused Austria-Hungary to concede the conflict by March 1908, as can be shown shown by the trade statistics of the period in question:

See also
Austro–Serbian Alliance of 1881

References 

Misha Glenny, The Balkans 1804-1999: Nationalism, War and the Great Powers (London: Granta, 1999), pp. 281–2.

1900s in Serbia
Pork
Causes of World War I
Politics of the Kingdom of Serbia
Economy of the Kingdom of Serbia
Economy of the Russian Empire
Trade wars
Austria-Hungary–Serbia relations
1906 in Austria-Hungary
1907 in Austria-Hungary
1908 in Austria-Hungary
1906 in Serbia
1907 in Serbia
1908 in Serbia
Serbia under Habsburg rule